Jason C. Ruff (born January 27, 1970) is a Canadian former professional ice hockey player.

Career 
Ruff was the third pick, 96th overall selection of the St. Louis Blues in the 1990 NHL Entry Draft. The following year, he was part of the WHL East First All-Star Team.

Ruff is a graduate of the Western Hockey League, where he spent four seasons as a member of the Lethbridge Hurricanes before joining the NHL with St. Louis Blues and later Tampa Bay Lightning.

Ruff has played for the Belfast Giants since the 2001–2002 season, with one year sojourns to Ingolstadt in the DEL (2002–2003) and Kansas City Outlaws (2004–2005). He was captain of the Giants in 2003–2004 and in the 2006–2007 season he was a Player/Assistant Coach.

Ruff retired from professional ice hockey and returned to Canada in 2007 to become assistant coach of the Lethbridge Hurricanes in the Western Hockey League.

Career statistics

Regular season and playoffs

Awards
 WHL East First All-Star Team – 1991

External links

1970 births
Living people
Atlanta Knights players
Belfast Giants players
Canadian ice hockey left wingers
Cleveland Lumberjacks players
ERC Ingolstadt players
Frankfurt Lions players
Houston Aeros (1994–2013) players
Ice hockey people from British Columbia
Sportspeople from Kelowna
Kansas City Outlaws players
Lethbridge Hurricanes players
Peoria Rivermen (IHL) players
Quebec Rafales players
San Diego Barracudas players
St. Louis Blues draft picks
St. Louis Blues players
Tampa Bay Lightning players
Canadian expatriate ice hockey players in the United States
Canadian expatriate ice hockey players in Germany
Canadian expatriate ice hockey players in Northern Ireland